Primitive Reason are an alternative cross-over rock band based in Lisbon, Portugal, with Guillermo de Llera (voice, percussion, didgeridoo), Abel Beja (guitar), Luís Pereira (bass), Tino Dias (drums), and Rui Travasso (Saxophone). 
Their 6th full-length album, 'Power To The People', was released on 1 April 2013.

Current members
Guillermo de Llera - lead vocals, percussion and didgeridoo, founding member
Abel Beja - guitar, backing vocals, since 2000
Tino Dias - drums, since 2012
Luís Pereira - bass, since 2010
Rui Travasso - saxophone, since 2010

Former members
João Rato - guitar - 1996-1997
Brian Jackson - singer - 1993-1999
Micas Ventura - guitar - 1993-1999
Mark Cain - saxophone - 1995-1999
Tom Martin - guest guitar player in the album Some of Us - 2000
Rob Dinero - turntables - 2000
Jorge Felizardo - drums  - 1993-2003
Tó Bravo - trombone - 2003
Nélson Sobral - drums - 2004
João Marques - trombone - 2004-2005
Marcos Alves - drums - 2003-2006
Hélder Brazete - drums - 2004-2006
Ricardo Magala - trumpet - 2004-2007
Jorge Mata - saxophone - 2005-2007
James Beja - bass - 2000-2008
Ricardo Barriga - guitar - 2007-2009
Pepe de Souza - drums, 2007-2011

Discography

References

External links
Official Website

Portuguese alternative rock groups